Ella Laureen Jarrett (born November 2, 1938) is a teacher and former political figure in New Brunswick, Canada. She represented Kings West and then Saint John Kings in the Legislative Assembly of New Brunswick from 1987 to 1999 as a Liberal member.

She was born in Halifax, Nova Scotia and was educated at the New Brunswick Teachers' College and the University of New Brunswick. Jarrett taught school in New Brunswick and Maine. She served in the province's Executive Council as the Minister of Income Assistance, the Minister of Supply and Services and the Minister of State for Mines and Energy.

References 
 List of Women MLAs, New Brunswick Legislative Library

1938 births
Living people
New Brunswick Liberal Association MLAs
Members of the Executive Council of New Brunswick
Women MLAs in New Brunswick
Women government ministers of Canada